The 1983 NCAA Division II football season, part of college football in the United States organized by the National Collegiate Athletic Association at the Division II level, began in August 1983, and concluded with the NCAA Division II Football Championship on December 10, 1983, at McAllen Veterans Memorial Stadium in McAllen, Texas. During the game's five-year stretch in McAllen, the "City of Palms", it was referred to as the Palm Bowl. The North Dakota State Bison defeated the Central State (Ohio), 41–21, to win their first Division II national title.

Conference changes and new programs

Conference standings

Conference summaries

Postseason

The 1983 NCAA Division II Football Championship playoffs were the 11th single-elimination tournament to determine the national champion of men's NCAA Division II college football. The championship game was held at McAllen Veterans Memorial Stadium in McAllen, Texas, for the third consecutive time.

Playoff bracket

See also
1983 NCAA Division I-A football season
1983 NCAA Division I-AA football season
1983 NCAA Division III football season
1983 NAIA Division I football season
1983 NAIA Division II football season

References